Lai Sun Cheung (1 September 1950 – 20 June 2010) was a Hong Kong football coach and a former professional football player. He was the former head coach of Hong Kong national football team, Hong Kong 08 and the Hong Kong under-23 football team.

Lai joined Rangers when he was Secondary 4. In 1969 & 1970, he joined the Hong Kong Youth Team and participated in youth tournaments in Japan. Then he represented Hong Kong.

From 2002 to 2006, then again in 2007, Lai coached the Hong Kong national football team.

On 20 June 2010, Lai died of lung cancer in Hong Kong, aged 59, after a one-year-battle with the disease.

References

1950 births
2010 deaths
Hong Kong footballers
Hong Kong Rangers FC players
Happy Valley AA players
Hong Kong national football team managers
Hong Kong football managers
Hong Kong First Division League players
Hong Kong international footballers
Deaths from lung cancer
Deaths from cancer in Hong Kong
Association football defenders